Geary is a surname. Notable people with the surname include: Jackie Geary from the television series "The Goldbergs"

Politics
Carl Robin Geary (d. 1910), elected posthumously as mayor of Tracy City, Tennessee
George Reginald Geary (1873–1954), mayor of Toronto, Ontario, Canada from 1910 to 1912
John W. Geary (1819–1873), mayor of San Francisco, governor of the Kansas Territory, governor of Pennsylvania and general in the American Civil War 
Thomas J. Geary, (1854-1929), U.S. Representative from California
Sir William Geary, 2nd Baronet (1756-1825), English politician
Sir William Geary, 3rd Baronet (1810-1877), English politician

Academics
David C. Geary (b. 1957), American academic psychologist
Dick Geary (b. 1945), British historian
Patrick J. Geary (b. 1948), American medieval historian
Roy C. Geary, (1896-1983), Irish social scientist

Military
Benjamin Handley Geary (1891–1976), British soldier in World War I and a recipient of the Victoria Cross 
Sir Francis Geary, 1st Baronet (1709-1796), Royal Navy admiral
Francis Geary (1752–1776), British officer (and son of Admiral Francis Geary) killed in the Ambush of Geary during the American Revolutionary War
General Sir Henry Leguay Geary, KCB (b. 1837), Governor of Bermuda
General John W. Geary US Civil war general

Arts and writers
Anthony "Tony" Geary (b. 1947), American actor 
Bud Geary (1898-1946), American film actor 
Caron Geary (b. 1963), English reggae musician, known as "MC Kinky"
Clifford Geary (1916-2008), American illustrator
Cynthia Geary (b. 1965), American actress probably best known for Northern Exposure
David Geary (b. 1963), New Zealand playwright
Emma Geary (b. 1977), British Pop-Surrealist artist, known as "Anarkitty"
James Geary (b. 1962), London-based editor of Time magazine and author of The Body Electric
Karl Geary (b. 1972), Irish-American actor
Lois Geary (1928-2015), American actress
Lori Geary, American TV broadcaster
Mark Geary (b. 1971), Irish singer-songwriter and musician
Patricia Geary, American novelist
Paul Geary (b. 1961), American rock and roll drummer and manager
Rick Geary (b. 1946), American cartoonist and illustrator
Thomas Augustine Geary (1775-1801), Irish composer

Sport
Albert Geary (1900–1989), English cricketer
Anna Geary, Irish camogie player
Bob Geary (1933–2001), Canadian football player and manager
Bob Geary (1891–1980), American baseball player
Brian Geary (b. 1980), Irish hurling player
Derek Geary (b. 1980), Irish footballer
Donald Geary (b. 1926), American ice hockey player
Fred Geary (1868–1955), English footballer
Fred Geary (1887–1980), English cricketer
Geoff Geary (b. 1976), American Major League Baseball player
George Geary (1893–1981) England cricketer
Guillermo Geary (1926–unknown), Argentinian athlete
Huck Geary (1917–1981), American baseball player
Jarryn Geary (b. 1988), Australian rules footballer
Karl Geary (b. 1982), English cricketer
Reggie Geary (b. 1973), American basketball player and coach
Richard Geary (b. 1963), Australian rules footballer
Sharon Geary, American swimmer
Terry Geary, Australian rugby league footballer

Others
Bob Geary, former San Francisco police officer best known for his ventriloquist's dummy, Brendan O'Smarty
Leslie "Ted" Geary (1885-1960), American yacht designer
Stephen Geary (1797-1854), British architect

Fictional characters
John Geary, protagonist of the military science fiction novel series The Lost Fleet
Pat Geary, character in the film The Godfather, Part II
Roy Geary (Prison Break), character from the television show Prison Break

See also
Geary baronets
Geary (given name)
McGeary